Lea is a small village and civil parish in the  West Lindsey district of Lincolnshire, England. The population of the civil parish at the 2011 census was 1,009.

Lea has a village hall, the Lea Institute, and a park with tennis court.

The primary school is the Frances Olive Anderson School.  The school was established by Lady Anderson in about 1814, and the current building was built as a Church of England (Aided) school in 1966. Extra classrooms were added in 1971.

The parish church is dedicated to St Helen.  It is one of seven churches in the Lea group of the Deanery of Corringham in the Diocese of Lincoln. The 2013 incumbent is Rev Phillip Wain. There is also a Methodist Chapel, part of the Gainsborough circuit.

The nearest railway station is Gainsborough Lea Road on the Sheffield to Lincoln Line, with services to Lincoln, Sheffield, Retford and Doncaster.  Lea is on a bus route, provided by Stagecoach, that runs from Scunthorpe to Lincoln.

References

External links

Civil parishes in Lincolnshire
Villages in Lincolnshire
West Lindsey District